Affiliated to the EHA, London GD Handball Club currently has 3 men's and 2 women's competitive handball teams in both the English National and Regional leagues, as well as a Youth Development Programme in place to generate Junior squads. The club which was formerly known as London Great Dane was founded in 1976.

Club history 
London GD Handball Club was previously known as Great Dane Handball Club, and was founded by Anne-Marie Thrysoe and Andrew Ferguson. Established in 1976 by a group of Danish girls involved with the Anglo-Danish Society Students Club, thereof the name of the club, "Great Dane".

Throughout the years, the club established itself firmly on the English handball scene, and has become much more than a club with mainly Danish players. In 2010, in a bid to reflect this, the club changed its name to London GD Handball Club and at the same time registered as a limited company. The East London-based club currently has over 100 registered players from at least 20 different countries, and many more people training with the club regularly.

The club started playing handball as a women's team only, with men occasionally coming to practice. They started training two days a week at Ruislip Eagles Sport Centre but soon moved to the new (at the time) Wapping Sport Centre in East London. London GD's main home ground is now the Olympic Handball Arena, also known as "Copper Box", although Leyton Score Centre remains as training venue for developing teams.

From 1976 to 1986, the club was heavily involved in the development of Handball in London with at one stage two sub venues spun off including Croydon and West London. The club also merged with another club at one stage run by Paul Bray.

Around 1980, members of the club formed the Greater London & South East Handball Association together with Ashford Tanners, Ruislip, Ipswich and other clubs in East London. The association is no longer active, but London GD is a member of the newly established London Handball Association that was set up in 2010.

In 2000, the back then called Great Danes started to get some success in both women's and men's handball and from then on the club has always been among the top three clubs in the country.

In 2005 the club participated in its first official European Competition by playing in round 2 of the men's Challenge Cup. Since then, London GD have participated every year.

In 2010, after winning their third Double (League and Cup Champions), the club's women's 1st team entered the Challenge Cup for the first time, managing an historic win against A.S. Aris Thessalonikis from Greece.

The 2010/11 season resulted in both league and cup victory for the men's team. This past September 2011 they have made history by winning their round 2 group in Malta to go through round 3 in Greece for the first time.

For the 2011/2012 season we entered two-second teams in the development leagues, both men and women, with the former winning the South Regional Championship.

After the London 2012 Olympic Games, London GD men 1st team participated in the new EHF Cup against a giant Danish Club, KIF Kolding Kopenhagen, playing their two games at foreign ground.

This past season 2012/2013 London GD ladies won the EHA Cup against Thames Handball Club, and the club's men 1st team won the Super 8 English National League without losing any single game, giving them the unique slot for EHF Cup again, which saw them playing against a Turkish team from Ankara in September 2013.

Teams

Women's current squad
Women Premier Handball League

Squad for the 2018–19 season

Goalkeepers
 58  Anna Baikova
 1   Nicole Zdzieblo

Wingers
LW
 31  Maria Marselli
 23  Nikola Szymura
 81  Ilaria Di Pastena
RW
 10  Thu Maria Tran
 18  Eva Salinas Rivada

Line players
 56  Aleksandra Garaloska

Women Regional Handball League

Squad for the 2018–19 season

GK
   Kaisa Bentzen
WING
  Alice Trotter
  Alysha Martin
   Juliana Amado
  Claire Cousin
  Dominika Kampa
  Marie Veyron

Men's current squad
Men Premier Handball League

Squad for the 2018–19 season

Goalkeepers
 1   Adriano Stagni
 58  Clement Baudot
 12  Theo Bougouin

Wingers
LW
  6  Martin Vanegue
 24  Björn Imöhl
 77  Silviu Hapenciuc
   Israel Camara
 49  Jehan Karkour

RW
 5    Dan-Emanuel
 61  Ruben Cabrera Martinez
Line players
 44  Jose Javier Ivorra Adrados
 19  Ayrton Gelin
 58  Clement Burry

Men Regional Handball League and 3rd team

Squad for the 2018–19 season

  Carlos Candel Gil
  Moritz Bannas
  Carlos De Cozar Martinez
  Musat drogos ionut
  Chris Hussey (handballer)Chris Hussey
  Nicolas Veillard
  Christopher Goodale
  Paul Garrett
  Clemens Moehring
  Qi Peng Wang
  Ferenc Kover
  Richard Brooks
  George Taylor

Back players
LB
 24  Claudia Schönbächler
CB
 3   Mayte Perez Laguna
 31  Christina Rehnberg
RB
 7   Tania Corti
 26  Juste Brazenaite

Coaches
  Jordi Cidoncha
  Jose Manuel Roldan
Fitness Coach
  Konstantinos Chiotelis

LINE
  Ines Cheaib
  Claudia Wessling
BACK
  Janou Janssens
  Julie Chicaud
  Brigitte Ringstad
  Helena Tisthammer
CENTER
  Liliana Da Silva
  Fanny Legrand
  Nathalie Leister
  Kate Napier
COACH
  Jose Javier Ivorra Adrados
Fitness Coach
  Konstantinos Chiotelis

Back players
LB
 29  Adria Gascon
 96  Mircea Viorel Panti
 46  Bill Taylor
 23  Nuno Goncalo Salgueiro Pires
CB
 3   Aurelian Gug
 21  Geoffroy Deneuville
 26  Valentin Truchot
 7   Jordi Ferrer-Torras
 13  Marvin Gorgen
RB
 48  Patrick Guenther
 55  Alexander Rauner
 56  Will Moore
Head Coach
     Miguel Puig
Assistant coach
     James N'Doumbe
Physiotherapist
     Sergio Otero Puig
  Ryan Matovu
  Guillaume Botbol
  Sam Kemp
  Igor Lozanoski
  Stefan Goetti
  Jakub Szypicyn
  Thomas Eckersall
  Konstantinos Chiotelis
  Thomas Feltin
  Laszlo Kun
  Tobias Hoering
  Luigi Calvo
  Tomas Zaboj
  Michaël Grosmaire
  Zvonimir Filjak
  Mohamed Koronfel
  Mariusz Urban
  Nikiforos
  Florian Lambinet
  Roger Kuhn
  Florian Wißgott
  Roi Dulman
  Florin Ginghina
  Rui Gomes

Club achievements

Men's First Team

Women's First Team

European track record
Women

Men

Individual players' achievements

Greater-London and South-East Select Men's Team 1981
Thorkild Hove and Paul Bray

Players who played for national teams
 Will Moore  United Kingdom
 Aleksandra Garaloska  Macedonia 
 Francesca Graham  New Zealand
 Maria Marselli  Cyprus (beach handball)

Juniors playing for national teams
 GB  Naomi Bell 
 GB  Aaron Bradley Shankar 
 GB  Bill Taylor

References

External links
 Official website
 Men 1st team profile on EHF website
 Women 1st team profile on EHF website
 Facebook page
 Twitter account
 Handball Blog

English handball clubs